Eupastranaia fenestrata is a moth in the family Crambidae. It was described by Édouard Ménétries in 1863. It is found in Bahia state in Brazil and Argentina.

References

Moths described in 1863
Midilinae